The 1958 Cork Senior Hurling Championship was the 70th staging of the Cork Senior Hurling Championship since its establishment by the Cork County Board in 1887. The draw for the opening round fixtures took place at the Cork Convention on 26 January 1958. The championship began on 23 March 1958 and ended on 21 September 1958.

Sarsfields entered the championship as the defending champions, however, they were defeated by Glen Rovers in the semi-final.

The final was played on 21 September 1958 at the Athletic Grounds in Cork, between Glen Rovers and St. Finbarr's, in what was their sixth ever meeting in the final and a first in three years. Glen Rovers won the match by 4-06 to 3-05 to claim their 16th championship title overall and a first title in four years.

Christy Ring was the championship's top scorer with 7–11.

Team changes

From Championship

Regraded to the Cork Intermediate Hurling Championship
 Nemo Rangers

Results

First round

Quarter-finals

Semi-finals

Final

Championship statistics

Top scorers

Top scorers overall

Top scorers in a single game

Miscellaneous

 Na Piarsaigh make their first appearance at senior level.

References

Cork Senior Hurling Championship
Cork Senior Hurling Championship